Eric McHenry (born April 12, 1972 Topeka, Kansas) is an American poet. He was the Poet Laureate of Kansas from 2015-2017.

Life
McHenry graduated from Topeka High School. He graduated from Beloit College and from Boston University. In April 2015 he was appointed to a two-year term as Poet Laureate of Kansas by the Kansas Humanities Council.

His work has appeared in The New Republic, Harvard Review, Northwest Review, Orion and AGNI.

He lives in Lawrence, Kansas with his family. He currently teaches at Washburn University in Topeka, Kansas, where he holds the position of Associate Professor of English.

Awards
 2007 Kate Tufts Discovery Award

Works

Poetry

Anthology

Essays
 "Auden on Bin Laden", Slate, Sept. 20, 2001

References

External links
 McHenry named Poet Laureate of Kansas
 Kansas Humanities Council

1972 births
Living people
Writers from Topeka, Kansas
American male poets
Beloit College alumni
Boston University alumni
Poets Laureate of Kansas
21st-century American poets
21st-century American male writers